In microbiology, streaking is a technique used to isolate a pure strain from a single species of microorganism, often bacteria. Samples can then be taken from the resulting colonies and a microbiological culture can be grown on a new plate so that the organism can be identified, studied, or tested.

The modern streak plate method has progressed from the efforts of Robert Koch and other microbiologists to obtain microbiological cultures of bacteria in order to study them. The dilution or isolation by streaking method was first developed by Loeffler and Gaffky in Koch's laboratory, which involves the dilution of bacteria by systematically streaking them over the exterior of the agar in a Petri dish to obtain isolated colonies which will then grow into quantity of cells, or isolated colonies. If the agar surface grows microorganisms which are all genetically same, the culture is then considered as a microbiological culture.

Technique
Streaking is rapid and ideally a simple process of isolation dilution. The technique is done by diluting a comparatively large concentration of bacteria to a smaller concentration. The decrease of bacteria should show that colonies are sufficiently spread apart to affect the separation of the different types of microbes. Streaking is done using a sterile tool, such as a cotton swab or commonly an inoculation loop. Aseptic techniques are used to maintain microbiological cultures and to prevent contamination of the growth medium. There are many different types of methods used to streak a plate. Picking a technique is a matter of individual preference and can also depend on how large the number of microbes the sample contains.

The three-phase streaking pattern, known as the T-Streak, is recommended for beginners. The streaking is done using a sterile tool, such as a cotton swab or commonly an inoculation loop. The inoculation loop is first sterilized by passing it through a flame. When the loop is cool, it is dipped into an inoculum such as a broth or patient specimen containing many species of bacteria. The inoculation loop is then dragged across the surface of the agar back and forth in a zigzag motion until approximately 30% of the plate has been covered. The loop then is re-sterilized and the plate is turned 90 degrees. Starting in the previously streaked section, the loop is dragged through it two to three times continuing the zigzag pattern. The procedure is then repeated once more being cautious to not touch the previously streaked sectors. Each time the loop gathers fewer and fewer bacteria until it gathers just single bacterial cells that can grow into a colony. The plate should show the heaviest growth in the first section. The second section will have less growth and a few isolated colonies, while the final section will have the least amount of growth and many isolated colonies.

Growth medium
The sample is spread across one quadrant of a Petri dish containing a growth medium. Bacteria need different nutrients to grow. This includes water, a source of energy, sources of carbon, sulfur, nitrogen, phosphorus, certain minerals, and other vitamins and growth factors. A very common type of media used in microbiology labs is known as agar, a gelatinous substance derived from seaweed. The nutrient agar  has a lot of ingredients with unknown amounts of nutrients in them. On one hand, this can be a very selective media to use because as mentioned bacteria are particular. If there is a certain nutrient in the media the bacteria could most certainly not grow and could die. On the other hand, this media is very complex. Complex media is important because it allows for a wide range of microbial growth. The bacteria growth can be supported by this media greatly due in part to the high amounts of nutrients.   Choice of which growth medium is used depends on which microorganism is being cultured, or selected for.

Incubation
Dependent on the strain, the plate may then be incubated, usually for 24 to 36 hours, to allow the bacteria to reproduce. At the end of incubation there should be enough bacteria to form visible colonies in the areas touched by the inoculation loop. From these mixed colonies, single bacterial or fungal species can be identified based on their morphological (size/shape/colour) differences, and then sub-cultured to a new media plate to yield a pure culture for further analysis.

Automated equipment is used at industrial level for streak plating the solid media in order to achieve better sterilization and consistency of streaking and for reliably faster work. While streaking manually it is important to avoid scratching the solid medium as subsequent streak lines will be damaged and non-uniform deposition of inoculum  at damaged sites on the medium yield clustered growth of microbes which may extend into nearby streak lines.

Importance 
Bacteria exist in water, soil and food, on skin, and intestinal tract normal flora. The assortment of microbes that exist in the environment and on human bodies is enormous. The human body has billions of bacteria which creates the normal flora fighting against the invading pathogens. Bacteria frequently occur in mixed populations. It is very rare to find a single occurring species of bacteria. To be able to study the cultural, morphological, and physiological characteristics of an individual species, it is vital that the bacteria be divided from the other species that generally originate in the environment. This is important in determining a bacterium in a clinical sample. When the bacteria is streaked and isolated, the causative agent of a bacterial disease can be identified.

See also
Bacterial lawn

References
 Black, Jacquelyn G. Microbiology: Principles and Explorations Marymount University, 1999
 Biotechnology and Biomedical Engineering : Amrita Vishwa Vidyapeetham Virtual Lab.
 http://www.personal.psu.edu/faculty/k/h/khb4/enve301/301labs/lab4pureculture.html
 Bauman, R. (2004) Microbiology. Pearson Benjamin Cummings.
Austerjost J, Marquard D, Raddatz L, Geier D, Becker T, Scheper T, Lindner, P, Beutel S. 2017. A smart device application for the automated determination of E. coli colonies on agar plates. Engineering in Life Sciences. 17(8): 959-966.
Bhattacharjee K, Joshi S. 2016. A selective medium for recovery and enumeration of endolithic bacteria. Journal of Microbiological Methods. 129(1): 44-54.
Brugger S, Baumberger C, Jost M,Jenni W, Brugger U, Mühlemann K. 2012. Automated counting of bacterial colony forming units on agar plates. PLoS ONE. 7(3):1-6.
Chang G, Grinshpun S, Willeke K, Mancher, J,Donnelly C. 1995. Factors affecting microbiological colony count accuracy for bioaerosol sampling and analysis. American Industrial Hygiene Association Journal. 56(10): 979-986.
Choi Q, Kim HJ, Kim JW, Kwon GC, Koo SH. 2018. Manual versus automated streaking system in clinical microbiology laboratory: Performance evaluation of Previ Isola for blood culture and body fluid samples. Journal of Clinical Laboratory Analysis. 32(5):1-7.
Geun C, Myoungjoo R, Choong-Min R. 2019. Beyond the two compartments Petri-dish: Optimising growth promotion and induced resistance in cucumber exposed to gaseous bacterial volatiles in a miniature greenhouse system. Plant Methods. 15(1): 1-11.
Ghivari S, Kubasad G, Deshpande P. 2012. Comparative evaluation of apical extrusion of bacteria using hand and rotary systems : An in vitro study. Journal of Conservative Dentistry. 15(1): 32-35.
Jones D, Smith H, Thieme H, Röst G. 2012. On Spread of Phage Infection of Bacteria in a Petri Dish. SIAM Journal on Applied Mathematics, 72(2): 670-688.
Kabanova N, Stulova I, Vilu R. 2013. Microcalorimetric study of growth of Lactococcus lactis IL1403 at low glucose concentration in liquids and solid agar gels. Thermochimica Acta, 559: 69-75.
Nottingham P, Rushbrook A, Jury K. 1975. The effect of plating technique and incubation temperature on bacterial counts. IFST. 10(3):273-279.
Safwat, N. 2013. Automation and beyond: Improving efficiency in the pathway from collection to care. Medical Laboratory Observer. 45(1).
Tomasino S, Pines R, Cottrill M, Hamilton M. 2008. Determining the efficacy of liquid sporicides against spores of Bacillus subtilis on a hard nonporous surface using the quantitative Three Step Method: Collaborative study. Journal of AOAC International, 91(4): 833-852.
Wang Z, Liu Y, Feng C, Wang C. 2016. Isolation and Identification of Saccharomycetes in Wine Grape Region of Chateau Changyu Moser XV. Agricultural Science & Technology. 17(12): 2689-2691,2700.

External links
 Streaking agar plate method for getting isolated colonies (video).

Microbiology techniques
Bacteriology